The 2001 UK Championship was a professional ranking snooker tournament that took place at the Barbican Centre in York, England. The event started on 3 December 2001 and the televised stages were shown on BBC between 8 and 16 December 2001. This was the first UK Championship to be held in York, becoming only the fourth venue in the championship's history.

John Higgins was the defending champion, but he lost his quarter-final match against Stephen Lee. Ronnie O'Sullivan won his third UK title by defeating Ken Doherty 10–1 in the final. This was the biggest win in the final since the championship introduced the best-of-19-frame finals in 1993. The victory meant that O'Sullivan – the reigning World Champion – had now won both major ranking events in the same calendar year. Peter Ebdon compiled the highest break, a 143, in his last 32 match against Michael Judge.

Tournament summary

Defending champion John Higgins was the number 1 seed with World Champion Ronnie O'Sullivan seeded 2. The remaining places were allocated to players based on the world rankings.

Prize fund

The breakdown of prize money for this year is shown below:
Winner: £100,000
Runner-up: £54,000
Highest break: £10,000
Total: £600,000

Main draw

 David Finbow retires due to health problems

Final

Century breaks
All rounds

 145  Darren Morgan
 143, 136, 117, 112  Peter Ebdon
 142, 131, 130, 110, 107, 106  Ronnie O'Sullivan
 140  Dominic Dale
 137, 136, 119  Stephen Lee
 137, 121, 109, 107  Mark Williams
 137  Fergal O'Brien
 136  John Higgins
 134, 130, 127, 121  Stephen Hendry
 129, 120  Michael Judge
 128, 104  Nick Dyson
 127  Steve Davis
 125  Tony Drago
 125  Bjorn Haneveer
 124  James Wattana
 123  Luke Fisher
 122, 109, 103, 101, 100, 100  Mark Davis
 121  Noppadon Noppachorn
 120, 117  Stephen Maguire
 118, 114, 114, 107, 101  Robin Hull

 117, 109  Matthew Stevens
 117  Graeme Dott
 117  Kurt Maflin
 114  Shaun Murphy
 114  Andrew Higginson
 112  Paul Hunter
 111  Ali Carter
 110  Adrian Gunnell
 110  Bradley Jones
 108, 101  Marco Fu
 107, 106, 104  Ken Doherty
 107  Antony Bolsover
 106  David Gray
 106  Nick Pearce
 104  Joe Swail
 103  Anthony Hamilton
 101  Mark Gray
 101  Neal Foulds
 101  Terry Murphy
 100  John Parrott

References

2001
UK Championship
Championship (snooker)
UK Championship